Shuicheng is a district in the west of Guizhou province, China, bordering Yunnan province to the west. It is under the administration of Liupanshui city.

Biodiversity
Shuicheng is home to two amphibian species that are not known from anywhere else: the horned toad Xenophrys shuichengensis and Shuicheng salamander (Pseudohynobius shuichengensis).

External links

 
County-level divisions of Guizhou
Liupanshui